Sinam is a 2022 Indian Tamil-language crime thriller film directed by G. N. R. Kumaravelan. The film stars Arun Vijay and Pallak Lalwani in the lead roles, while Shabir composed the soundtrack album and background score. The title of the film was announced on 6 November 2019. The film was released theatrically worldwide on 16 September 2022 to mixed reviews from critics.

Synopsis
Paari Venkat is a police Sub-inspector, who lives happily with his wife, Madhangi, and daughter. Everything goes well, until, Madhangi suddenly goes missing. He starts investigating about her, along with police constable Kadal. Soon, he gets to know that his wife was raped and killed. How Paari Venkat finds and punishes the killers behind the heinous act, forms the rest of the story.

Cast
 Arun Vijay as Inspector Paari Venkat
 Pallak Lalwani as Madhangi
 Kaali Venkat as Police Constable Kadal
 R. N. R. Manohar as Commissioner Velayudham
 Baby Desina as Paari Venkat's daughter 
 K. S. G. Venkatesh as Rajamanickam, Madhangi’s father
 Rekha Suresh as Madhangi’s mother
 Marumalarchi Bharathi as Auto driver
 Tamizh as Jaga

Production
The film was tentatively titled as AV30. On 6 November 2019, the title of the film was announced to be Sinam. The shooting of the film was wrapped up on 2 March 2020. It was also announced that Pallak Lalwani would be playing the female lead opposite Arun Vijay. On 20 November 2019, the makers unveiled the first look poster of the film coinciding on the eve of Arun Vijay's 42th birthday. On 14 August 2020, the makers also released the second look poster of the film.

Music

The film’s music is composed by Shabir.

Release

Theatrical 
The film was released theatrically worldwide on 16 September 2022. Earlier the makers had opted for direct release on OTT due to increase in COVID-19 cases, however Arun Vijay clarified that the film would release only in theatres. The trailer of the film was released on 31 August 2022.

Home Media
The post-theatrical streaming rights of the film was bought by Netflix and the satellite rights of the film was bought by Kalaignar TV. The film was digitally streamed on Netflix from 10 November 2022.

Reception
Logesh Balachandran of The Times of India rated 2.5 out of 5 stars and wrote "The investigative sequences in the second half lack depth and aren't intriguing enough." Navein Darshan of The New Indian Express rated the film 1.5 out of 5 stars and wrote "Sinam aims to be an emotionally stirring film, the absence of silence and a subtler score only disconnects the audience from the film". Haricharan Pudipeddi of Hindustan Times wrote "Sinam, with more sensitive writing, could’ve been a far more engaging thriller." Bhuvanesh Chandar of The Hindu wrote that "Sinam is the kind of movie that tires you to the extent you begin to not care to count its flaws." Dinamalar rated the film 2.75 out of 5. Siddharth Srinivas of Only Kollywood gave the film’s rating 3 out of 5 and wrote "On the whole, Sinam may not have great shakes but is still a good thriller that is worth watching for fans of the genre." Indiaglitz rated the film 2.75 out of 5 and stated that "Sinam is a crispy investigative thriller that stays within its limits."

References

External links
 

2022 films
Films postponed due to the COVID-19 pandemic
2020s Tamil-language films